Ano Liosia is a train station in Ano Liosia, a western suburb of Athens, Greece. It is located in the median strip of the Attiki Odos motorway, and has a single island platform. The station is the western terminus of Line 4 of the Athens Suburban Railway to and from Athens Airport. It is also served by Line 2 between Piraeus and Kiato. it sits a 700 meaters from Zefyri, or a 2 min train ride.

History
It opened on 18 July 2006. In 2008, all Athens Suburban Railway services were transferred from OSE to TrainOSE. In 2009, with the Greek debt crisis unfolding OSE's Management was forced to reduce services across the network. Timetables were cutback and routes closed, as the government-run entity attempted to reduce overheads. In 2017 OSE's passenger transport sector was privatised as TrainOSE, currently, a wholly-owned subsidiary of Ferrovie dello Stato Italiane rail infrastructure, remained under the control of OSE and station infrastructure under Gaiose. In July 2022, the station began being served by Hellenic Train, the rebranded TranOSE.

Facilities
The station building is above the platforms, with access to the platform level via stairs or lifts. The station buildings are also equipped with toilets and a ticket office (closed as of 2020). There is no cafe or shop on-site. However, vending machines are provided (inoperable as of 2021). At platform level, there are sheltered seating, Dot-matrix display departure or arrival screens and timetable poster boards on all the platforms. There are lifts and stairs to the Island platform's. Access to platforms 1-2 is via the main concourse. There is no passenger car park at this station. Outside the station, there is a taxi rank and bus stop where the local 723, 749 & B12 call.

Services

Since 15 May 2022, the following weekday services call at this station:

Station layout

Future
In 2009, a future connection to Line 2 of the Athens Metro was officially proposed. However, according to the October 2022 plan, the Line 2 station will be built in Zefyri instead.

See also
Railway stations in Greece
Hellenic Railways Organization
Hellenic Train
Proastiakos

References

West Athens (regional unit)
Buildings and structures in West Attica
Transport in West Attica
Fyli
Railway stations in Attica
Railway stations in highway medians
Railway stations opened in 2006